{{Infobox Christian leader
| type = Bishop
| honorific-prefix = His Excellency, The Most Reverend
| name = David Konderla
| title = Bishop of Tulsa
| image = 
| alt = 
| caption = 
| archdiocese = Oklahoma City
| diocese = Tulsa
| see = 
| appointed = May 13, 2016
| enthroned = June 29, 2016
| predecessor = Edward Slattery
| successor = 
| ordination = June 3, 1991
| ordained_by = John E. McCarthy
| consecration = June 29, 2016
| consecrated_by = Paul Stagg Coakley, Edward James Slattery, Joe S. Vásquez
| other_post = 
| previous_post = 
| birth_name = 
| birth_date = 
| birth_place = Bryan, Texas, US
| death_date = 
| death_place = 
| motto = Nisi Dominus aedificaverit''(Unless the Lord had built)
| coat_of_arms = 
| image_size = 200px
| education = St. Mary's SeminaryUniversity of St. Thomas
}}David Austin Konderla''' (born June 3, 1960) is an American prelate of the Roman Catholic Church, who was appointed the fourth bishop of the Diocese of Tulsa in Oklahoma on May 13, 2016.

Biography

Early life 
David Konderla was born on June 3, 1960, in Bryan, Texas, the second of twelve children.He graduated from Bryan High School in 1978 and then worked as a machinist for several years. He entered the seminary in 1985 and earned a Bachelor of History degree from the University of Dallas in 1989. He received a Master of Divinity degree from the University of St. Thomas in Houston, Texas, and St. Mary's Seminary.

Priesthood 
Konderla was ordained a priest on June 3, 1995, for the Diocese of Austin by Bishop John McCarthy.  He served at St. Louis Parish in Austin, Texas, and St. Luke's Parish in Temple, Texas, before going to St. Mary's as associate pastor for four years. Konderla then became vocation director for the diocese.

Beginning in August 2005, Konderla served as the pastor and director of campus ministry at St. Mary's Catholic Center at Texas A&M University in College Station, Texas. He also held several diocesan positions, serving on its college of consultors, its presbyteral council, and its priest personnel board.

Bishop of Tulsa
Pope Francis appointed Konderla as bishop of the Diocese of Tulsa on May 13, 2016. His consecration by Archbishop Paul Stagg took place on June 29, 2016.  Konderla's hobbies include carpentry and woodworking.

See also

 Catholic Church hierarchy
 Catholic Church in the United States
 Historical list of the Catholic bishops of the United States
 List of Catholic bishops of the United States
 Lists of patriarchs, archbishops, and bishops

References

External links

 Diocese of Tulsa official site
 Father David Austin Konderla at Catholic-Hierarchy.com

Episcopal succession

 

1960 births
Living people
People from Bryan, Texas
University of Dallas alumni
University of St. Thomas (Texas) alumni
21st-century Roman Catholic bishops in the United States
Bishops appointed by Pope Francis